Jane Coombs is a New Zealand diplomat who was Ambassador to South Korea and has been the Permanent Representative to the Organization for Economic Co-Operation and Development (OECD) since September 2017.  She is cross accredited to France, Monaco, Portugal and Senegal.

Coombs studied at St Hilda's Collegiate School.

References

Ambassadors of New Zealand to South Korea
Ambassadors of New Zealand to the Organisation for Economic Co-operation and Development
Ambassadors of New Zealand to France
New Zealand women ambassadors
Ambassadors to Monaco
Ambassadors to Portugal
Ambassadors to Senegal
People educated at St Hilda's Collegiate School
Year of birth missing (living people)
Living people
21st-century New Zealand women politicians